William Harrison "Reddy" Rowe (August 18, 1887 – May 27, 1966) was an American football and baseball player and coach.  He served as the head football coach at Elon College—now known as Elon University—in 1909 and at Wake Forest University in 1910, compiling a career college football record of 6–8.  Rowe was born on August 18, 1887 in Plymouth, North Carolina.  He died on May 27, 1966 in Durham, North Carolina.

Head coaching record

Football

Notes

 Nickname also given as "Reddi", "Reddie" and "Red".

References

External links
 
 

1887 births
1966 deaths
American football quarterbacks
Elon Phoenix football coaches
Elon Phoenix football players
Albany Senators players
Brantford Red Sox players
Greensboro Patriots players
Lynchburg Shoemakers players
Ottawa Senators (baseball) players
Raleigh Red Birds players
Wake Forest Demon Deacons football coaches
Minor league baseball managers
People from Plymouth, North Carolina
Coaches of American football from North Carolina
Players of American football from North Carolina
Baseball players from North Carolina
Baseball coaches from North Carolina